Feel It is the debut studio album by Some Girls, released in 2003 (see 2003 in music).

Track listing

Personnel
Juliana Hatfield - vocals, guitars and keyboards
Heidi Gluck - bass, vocals, harmonica, slide, lap steel and keyboards
Freda Love - drums, percussion and vocals
Jake Smith - percussion, keyboards and backing vocals

Production
Producer: Jake Smith
Engineer: Mike Stucker, Mark Maher, Paul Mahern, Vess Ruhtenberg and LonPaul Ellrich
Mixing: Jake Smith and Some Girls
Mastering: Jonathan Wyner
Design: Juliana Hatfield
Photography: Dylan Long and Tom Dube

References

This link is wrong - it links to Strange Behaviour by Animotion; correct link = http://www.allmusic.com/album/feel-it-mw0000692230

Some Girls (band) albums
2003 debut albums